Mark Fitzloff (born February 3, 1971 in Milwaukee, Wisconsin) is an American advertising creative director and the founder of the Opinionated advertising agency. He is most known for his work at Wieden+Kennedy on Nike and Coca-Cola, and for reviving Procter & Gamble's Old Spice brand. He is also the executive producer and screenwriter of Tempbot, Neill Blomkamp's cult short film.

Mark worked as a writer, creative director and Executive Creative director in the Portland, Oregon headquarters of Wieden+Kennedy, Nike's long-standing advertising agency. Mark ran W+K's Portland office with partners Susan Hoffman and Tom Blessington. He also oversaw the global network of WK as global ECD.

Mark started working at W+K in 1999. His creative career highlights include multiple super bowl commercials, repeated recognition by top award shows, including Cannes, D&AD, Clios and the One Show, and leading new business for W+K including Coca-Cola, P&G and Levi's. He has also been interviewed in several business and industry trade publications, as well as on Fox News, discussing creativity in Super Bowl advertising.

In 2015, Mark served as the Titanium Jury President at the Cannes Lions International Festival of Creativity.

Mark founded his own agency called Opinionated in 2017. Opinionated has done work for adidas, Unilever and Pepsico among other notable brands and has been named AdAge Small Agency of the Year five years in a row.

References

External links
A list of TV/Film/Digital adverts by Mark Fitzloff at Advertolog
A list of Print/Outdoor adverts by Mark Fitzloff at Advertolog

1971 births
Living people
Advertising directors
American copywriters
American art directors
American male screenwriters
Writers from Portland, Oregon
Wieden+Kennedy people
Screenwriters from Oregon